Saint Petersburg Aquatics (SPA) is a year-round competitive swim team located at Northshore Aquatic Complex in Saint Petersburg, Florida. The club has previously been awarded the Bronze Medal status by USA Swimming, designating St. Petersburg Aquatics as one of the top 200 clubs in the country. SPA has produced a number of collegiate level swimmers, Olympic Trial Swimmers, and Team USA swimmers.

Locations

Saint Petersburg Aquatics' main pool is located within the Northshore Aquatic Complex. During summer, Saint Petersburg Aquatics offers practices at other various area pools.

Notable SPA Swimmers
Robert Finke is one of Saint Petersburg Aquatics' previous swimmers.  Finke placed first in both the 800m and 1500m freestyle at the Tokyo 2020 Olympics.

Melanie Margalis swam for Saint Petersburg Aquatics while she was in high school. Melanie is also the sister of Robert Margalis.

Joshua McQueen swam for Saint Petersburg Aquatics. In 2017, McQueen broke the nearly 20 year old Saint Petersburg city record for the 200 yard freestyle. The same day, McQueen also broke the record for the 500 yard freestyle.

Megan Romano is an American competition swimmer who specializes in backstroke and freestyle events. Romano swam for Fred Lewis on Saint Petersburg Aquatics before becoming a Georgia Bulldog.

Robert Margalis swam for Saint Petersburg Aquatics.

Coaches
Saint Petersburg Aquatics' head coach is Fred Lewis. Lewis was at coach at the University of Pittsburgh and became SPA's full time head coach in 1988.

References 

Sports teams in Florida
Swim teams in the United States
Sports in St. Petersburg, Florida